Grabowhöfe is a municipality  in the Mecklenburgische Seenplatte district, in Mecklenburg-Vorpommern, Germany.

References